Rhythm of the Rio Grande is a 1940 American Western film directed by Albert Herman and written by Robert Emmett Tansey. The film stars Tex Ritter, Suzan Dale, Warner Richmond, Martin Garralaga, Frank Mitchell and Mike J. Rodriguez. The film was released on March 2, 1940, by Monogram Pictures.

Plot

Cast          
Tex Ritter as Tex Regan
Suzan Dale as Ruth Crane
Warner Richmond as Buck
Martin Garralaga as Pablo 
Frank Mitchell as Shorty 
Mike J. Rodriguez as Lopez 
Juan Duval as Rego 
Tris Coffin as Jim Banister
Chick Hannan as Pete 
Earl Douglas as Blackie
Forrest Taylor as Edward Crane
Glenn Strange as Hays 
James McNally as Ransom

References

External links
 

1940 films
American Western (genre) films
1940 Western (genre) films
Monogram Pictures films
Films directed by Albert Herman
American black-and-white films
1940s English-language films
1940s American films